Codementor is an online platform allowing coders to link up with "mentors" and clients to hire coders for projects on a freelance basis. The company is based in Taipei, Taiwan, and San Francisco, California.

History
 
Codementor was founded in 2013 by Weiting Liu.

Codementor received the initial funding from Kai-Fu Lee’s venture capital firm TMI and participated in the Techstars accelerator program in Seattle in 2013. It was officially launched in 2014.

In 2015, Codementor announced the launch of Live Group classes. That same year, the company also announced a partnership with online learning platform Udemy.

Codementor was one of the startups chosen by the Taiwanese Government to represent Taiwan in the 2016 TechCrunch Disrupt hackathon in San Francisco. In March 2016, Codementor announced a partnership with Africa-based startup Andela.

In 2016, Codementor raised $1.6 million in a seed funding round.

During the COVID-19 pandemic, Codementor launched an initiative designed to match coders with software projects in the fight against the virus.

References

External links 
  Official website
 Official website

Educational technology companies
Education companies established in 2015
Virtual learning environments
American companies established in 2015